The Zilkha Neurogenetic Institute on the University of Southern California campus is a neurological and psychiatric diseases research facility. It is an organized research unit of the Keck School of Medicine of USC.

The Institute is partially funded from the 1999 naming gift of $110 million, given by the W. M. Keck Foundation to the then-USC School of Medicine; the gift designated $22 million to build the new Zilkha Neurogenetic Institute facility on the Health Sciences Campus.  Construction of the Institute began in the fall 2001, and it opened in January 2003.  The National Institutes of Health also awarded two million dollar construction grants to the Keck School of Medicine.

At the institute, basic and clinical neuroscientists work together to understand and ultimately develop cures for a range of neurological and psychiatric disorders such as Alzheimer's disease, amyotrophic lateral sclerosis, anxiety disorders,  bipolar disorders, depression, schizophrenia, etc.

References

External links
 

Keck School of Medicine of USC
Institutes of the University of Southern California
Medical research institutes in California
Zilkha Neurogenetic Institute
Bipolar disorder researchers
Healthcare in Los Angeles